Joseph Champlin Stone (July 30, 1829 – December 3, 1902) was a pioneer doctor and one-term Republican U.S. Representative from Iowa's 1st congressional district.

Born in Westport, New York, Stone moved to Iowa Territory in 1844.
He attended the public schools.
In 1854, he graduated from the Saint Louis University School of Medicine, in St. Louis, Missouri, and returned to Iowa (now a state) to practice.

During the Civil War Dr. Stone enlisted as a private in the Union Army and was made adjutant of the 1st Regiment Iowa Volunteer Cavalry. He was promoted to captain and assistant adjutant general of volunteers in 1862, and served until the end of the war.
He resumed the practice of medicine in Burlington, Iowa.

In 1876, Stone was elected as a Republican to represent Iowa's 1st congressional district in the U.S. House. He served in the Forty-fifth Congress  from March 4, 1877 to March 3, 1879. He was a candidate for the Republican nomination in 1878, but finished behind Moses A. McCoid, who succeeded Stone after winning the general election. 
Returning to Iowa, he again engaged in the practice of his profession.

He died in Burlington on December 3, 1902. He was interred in Aspen Grove Cemetery.

References

External links

 

1829 births
1902 deaths
Union Army officers
Republican Party members of the United States House of Representatives from Iowa
People from Westport, New York
19th-century American politicians